Naijaloaded is a Nigerian music website founded by Makinde Azeez in 2009. It was nominated for the 2017 and 2018 City People Entertainment Awards and 2016 The Beatz Awards for "Best Music Website".

References 

Music review websites
Internet properties established in 2009
Nigerian music websites
Online magazines published in Nigeria